The 2014–15 Turkish Basketball Cup tournament, for sponsorship reasons the FIAT Turkish Cup, is the 29th edition of what the professional men's basketball teams of Turkey could vie for the Turkish Cup in the final. The tournament was held at the Bursa Atatürk Sport Hall in Bursa, Turkey. It was held from 17-21 February.

Final 8
The Final 8 played a knock-out tournament at the Karataş Şahinbey Sport Hall in Gaziantep, Turkey.

Final

See also
2014–15 Turkish Basketball League

References

Turkish Cup Basketball seasons
Cup